The 2016 United States Senate election in Alaska was held on November 8, 2016, to elect a member of the United States Senate to represent the State of Alaska, concurrently with the 2016 U.S. presidential election, as well as other elections to the United States Senate in other states and elections to the United States House of Representatives and various state and local elections.

Incumbent Republican Senator Lisa Murkowski won re-election to a third term in office. The primaries were held on August 16. She was challenged by several candidates, including Democrat Ray Metcalfe, a former Republican state legislator; Independent Margaret Stock, an attorney; and Libertarian Joe Miller, who had defeated Murkowski for the Republican nomination six years before.

Murkowski was re-elected with 44.4% of the vote, becoming the first person in history to win three elections to the U.S. Senate with pluralities but not majorities, having taken 48.6% in 2004 and 39.5% in 2010. Miller's 29.2% finish was then the best ever for a Libertarian candidate in a U.S. Senate election in terms of vote percentage. This record was surpassed four years later by Ricky Dale Harrington Jr., who received 33.4% of the vote in the 2020 Arkansas Senate election, which had no Democratic candidate.

This was the first U.S. Senate election where the Democratic nominee finished fourth since the 1942 Minnesota race.

Background 
After Republican U.S. Senator Frank Murkowski was elected Governor of Alaska in 2002, he appointed his daughter Lisa to the Senate to replace him. She was elected to a full term in 2004 but was defeated in the Republican primary in 2010 by Tea Party challenger Joe Miller. She ran as a write-in candidate in the general election and was re-elected to a second full term with 39.5% of the vote to Miller's 35.5% and Democratic nominee Scott McAdams' 23.5%. She is one of only two U.S. Senators to be elected via write-in votes, the other being Strom Thurmond in 1954.

Republican primary 
As Murkowski was defeated in the Republican primary in 2010, it had been speculated that she would be challenged from the right again in 2016.

Candidates

Declared 
 Paul Kendall
 Thomas Lamb, candidate for the state house in 2006
 Bob Lochner, mechanic and candidate for the state house in 1996
 Lisa Murkowski, incumbent U.S. Senator since 2002

Withdrew 
 Dan Sullivan, former mayor of Anchorage and nominee for lieutenant governor in 2014 (Not related to Alaska's other senator, also named Dan Sullivan)

Declined 
 David Cuddy, former state representative and candidate for the U.S. Senate in 1996 and 2008
 Mike J. Dunleavy, state senator
 Joe Miller, former magistrate judge, the Republican nominee for the U.S. Senate in 2010 and candidate for the U.S. Senate in 2014
 Sarah Palin, former governor of Alaska and nominee for Vice President of the United States in 2008
 Sean Parnell, former governor of Alaska and candidate for Congress in 2008
 Mead Treadwell, former lieutenant governor and candidate for U.S. Senate in 2014

Endorsements

Results

Democratic–Libertarian–Independence primary 
Candidates from the Alaska Democratic Party, Alaska Libertarian Party and Alaskan Independence Party appear on the same ballot, with the highest-placed candidate from each party receiving that party's nomination.

Democratic candidates

Declared 
 Edgar Blatchford, founder and former editor and publisher of Alaska Newspapers, Inc., former mayor of Seward and former commissioner of the Alaska Department of Commerce, Community and Economic Development
 Ray Metcalfe, former Republican State Representative, founder of the Republican Moderate Party of Alaska and perennial candidate

Removed 
 Richard Grayson, perennial candidate from New York

Declined 
 Mark Begich, former U.S. Senator

Libertarian candidates

Declared 
 Cean Stevens, small business owner, nominee for the state house in 2014 and Republican nominee for the state house in 2012

Results

Subsequent events 
Cean Stevens was originally the only Libertarian to file, and was the sole Libertarian in the primary. Stevens withdrew after winning the nomination, and the Alaska Libertarian Party nominated Joe Miller as her replacement.

Third party and independent candidates

Declared 
 Breck Craig (Independent)
 Ted Gianoutsos (Independent), founder of the Veterans Party of Alaska and perennial candidate
 Margaret Stock (Independent), attorney and retired Army Lt. Colonel

Failed to qualify 
 Sid Hill (Independent)
 Bruce Walden (Veterans Party), retired army sergeant and Republican candidate for the state house in 2006
 Jed Whittaker (Independent), commercial fisherman, Republican candidate for the U.S. Senate in 1992 and Green Party nominee for the U.S. Senate in 1996

Declined 
 Mark Begich (write-in), former U.S. Senator

General election

Debates 
 Complete video of debate, November 4, 2016 - C-SPAN

Fundraising

Predictions

Polling

Endorsements

Results

Notes

References

External links 
Official campaign websites
 Lisa Murkowski (R) for Senate
 Ray Metcalfe (D) for Senate
 Joe Miller (L) for Senate
 Margaret Stock (I) for Senate
 Breck Craig (I) for Senate
 Ted Gianoutsos (NA) for Senate 

2016 Alaska elections
2016
Alaska